Rimario Allando Gordon (born July 6, 1994) is a Jamaican professional footballer who currently plays as a forward for V.League 1 club Becamex Bình Dương .

During his stint in the United States, before playing for Marshall University, Rimario made his mark playing for one of the top high school soccer teams, Alief Elsik High School Boys Soccer Team. Gordon has been coached by former Inter Milan player, Mohamed Kallon, and with USA TODAY Soccer Coach of the Year (2018), Vincenzo Cox.

References

External links

1994 births
Living people
Association football forwards
Hoang Anh Gia Lai FC players
Hanoi FC players
V.League 1 players
Jamaican footballers
Jamaican expatriate footballers
Jamaican expatriate sportspeople in Vietnam
Expatriate footballers in Vietnam